Ladislav Nemet (born September 7, 1956) is the Serbian Roman Catholic prelate who has been the Archbishop of Belgrade since November 2022. Before that, he was the Bishop of Zrenjanin between 2008 nad 2022. He is the member of the Society of the Divine Word. He has been the President of International Episcopal Conference of Saints Cyril and Methodius since 2016.

References

External links

 Bishop Ladislav Nemet, S.V.D. - Catholic Hierarchy
 Diocese of Zrenjanin, Serbia - GCatholic
 Wayback Machine - Zrenjanin's Diocese 

1956 births
People from Odžaci
21st-century Roman Catholic bishops in Serbia
Serbian people of Hungarian descent
Divine Word Missionaries Order
Living people